The Egypt Billie Jean King Cup team represents Egypt in the Billie Jean King Cup tennis competition and are governed by the Egyptian Tennis Federation.  They currently compete in the Europe/Africa Zone of Group III.

History
Egypt competed in its first Fed Cup in 1986, but did not play again until 1994.  They then competed again in 1995, but not in 1996.  Since 1997, Egypt has taken part in every edition.  Their best result was second place in their Group II pool in 2001 and 2003.

Current team (2017)
Sandra Samir
Ola Abou Zekry
Mai El Kamash
Rana Sherif Ahmed

See also
Fed Cup
Egypt Davis Cup team

External links

Billie Jean King Cup teams
Fed Cup
Fed Cup
1986 establishments in Egypt